Bursa is a large city in Turkey

Bursa may also refer to:

Places and jurisdictions
 Bursa Province, Asian Turkey, named after its above capital
 Bursa (electoral district)
 Bursa (woreda), a district in Southern Nations, Nationalities, and Peoples' Region, Ethiopia

Biology
 Bursa (genus), a genus of gastropods
 Bursa of Fabricius, a lymphatic organ in birds
 Bursa Tumbler, a breed of domestic pigeon
 Synovial bursa, a fluid filled sac located between a bone and tendon

Finance
 Bursa Efek Indonesia or Indonesia Stock Exchange, previously two separate entities:
 Bursa Efek Jakarta or Jakarta Stock Exchange
 Bursa Efek Surabaya or Surabaya Stock Exchange
 Bursa Malaysia, the Malaysian stock exchange
 Tel Aviv Stock Exchange, also known as The Bursa

Other uses
 Bursa (liturgy), an embroidered pouch containing the corporal used in the Holy Mass
 Bursa (Romanian newspaper), published in Bucharest
 Bursa (Star Wars), a fictional creature
 SS Bursa, a British tanker in service 1946–1961
 Bursa, a 1946 meteorite that fell in Bursa, Turkey

See also 

 Bursar
 Bourse (disambiguation)
 Brusa (disambiguation)